Colonel Alexander Perceval (1787 – 9 December 1858) was an Irish politician.

He was the eldest surviving son of Rev. Philip Perceval of Temple House, Ballymote, Sligo. He succeeded his father in 1800.

He sat in the House of Commons for Sligo County from 1831 to 1841, when his growing financial difficulties compelled him to resign his seat. He served briefly as a Junior Lord of the Treasury in Sir Robert Peel's second government (1841).
He was Sergeant-at-Arms of the House of Lords from 1841 until his death.

He died at Chester Street, London, on 9 December 1858 and was buried at West Norwood Cemetery. He had married Jane Anne, the daughter of Col. Henry Peisley L’Estrange of Moystown, Cloghan, King's County and had a large family. Due to his extravagance Temple House had to be sold but was bought back for the family by his third son, also Alexander (1821-1866).

References

Public Record Office of Northern Ireland

External links 
 

1788 births
1858 deaths
Military personnel from Derbyshire
British Army officers
Politicians from Derbyshire
Burials at West Norwood Cemetery
Members of the Parliament of the United Kingdom for County Sligo constituencies (1801–1922)
Politicians from County Sligo
UK MPs 1831–1832
UK MPs 1832–1835
UK MPs 1835–1837
UK MPs 1837–1841
Serjeants-at-arms of the House of Lords